Dy is a surname in Cambodia and the Philippines.

Origins
As an English surname,  Dy is a variant spelling of Dye, which may have come from the Greek masculine given name Dionysios or its feminine form Dionysia. One early record of the surname Dy is in the 1379 poll tax returns of Yorkshire. Another known origin of the surname is from the Chinese Filipino community, where Dy transcribes a Hokkien pronunciation of the Chinese surname spelled Lǐ in the Hanyu Pinyin transcription of its Mandarin pronunciation. There is also a Khmer surname transcribed as Dy.

Statistics
The 2010 United States Census found 1,932 people with the surname Dy, making it the 15,232nd-most-common name in the country. This represented an increase from 1,422 (18,077th-most-common) in the 2000 census. In both censuses, slightly less than nine-tenths of the bearers of the surname identified as Asian, and about five percent as White.

People
 Tomas Dy-Liacco (1920–2019), Filipino-American electrical engineer
 Dy Proeung (born 1930s), Cambodian architect
 Pauline Dy Phon (1933–2010), Cambodian botanist at the National Museum of Natural History in France
 Dy Saveth (born 1944), Cambodian actress and the first Miss Cambodia (1959)
 Benjamin Dy (1952–2013), Filipino politician
 Luane Dy (born 1986), Filipino television personality
 Denise Dy (born 1989), Filipino tennis player
 Jason Dy (born 1990), Filipino singer
 Rolando Dy (born 1990), Filipino mixed martial artist
 Kim Kianna Dy (born 1995), Filipino volleyball player
 Philbert Dy, Filipino film critic

See also
Di (surname)
DY (rapper)

References

English-language surnames
Hokkien-language surnames
Khmer-language names